Donald Amrul Kayum (born 13 October 1955) is a Guyanese former cricketer.

Kayum was born in British Guiana at Georgetown. After studying at Chatham House Grammar School in Ramsgate and playing cricket for Broadstairs CC, he attended the University of Oxford in England, studying at Lincoln College. While studying at Oxford, he made his debut in first-class cricket for Oxford University against Gloucestershire at Oxford in 1977. He played first-class cricket for Oxford until 1978, making twelve appearances. Playing as a batsman, he scored 423 runs for Oxford at an average of 24.88 and a high score of 57, one of three half centuries he made. In addition to playing first-class cricket while at Oxford, he also made a single List A one-day appearance for the Combined Universities cricket team against Hampshire at Fenner's in the 1978 Benson & Hedges Cup, in which he was dismissed without scoring by Mike Taylor.

References

External links

1955 births
Living people
People from Georgetown, Guyana
Guyanese expatriates in England
Alumni of Lincoln College, Oxford
English cricketers
Oxford University cricketers
British Universities cricketers